Sir Anthony Brian Cleaver HonFREng (born 10 April 1938) started his career as a systems engineer with IBM UK Ltd in 1962. He went on to become a Chief Executive and Chairman. He was Chairman of the United Kingdom Atomic Energy Authority and steered AEA Technology through its privatisation. He also chaired the UK Nuclear Decommissioning Authority and the Medical Research Council.

Biography
Cleaver studied Literae Humaniores at Trinity College, Oxford, graduating in 1962.

He has served on the boards of Smith and Nephew, Lockheed Martin UK and IX Europe. In the field of education, Cleaver has chaired the Governors of Birkbeck, University of London and the Royal College of Music, both in London. In August 2007, Cleaver was appointed Chairman of EngineeringUK (formerly the Engineering and Technology Board (ETB)). In this role, Cleaver was a driving force behind the founding of the UK's Big Bang Fair which was first run in 2008 and by 2015 had become one of Europe's largest science, engineering and technology fairs for young people. Cleaver retired from his role at EngineeringUK in 2011 and as Patron of the Big Bang Fair a few years later.

He is chairman of recruitment company SThree and financial wrap provider, Novia Financial

References 

1938 births
Alumni of Trinity College, Oxford
Businesspeople awarded knighthoods
English chief executives
Computer systems engineers
Fellows of Trinity College, Oxford
IBM employees
Knights Bachelor
Living people
People associated with Birkbeck, University of London